Nance Clare Donkin  (7 March 1915 – 18 April 2008) was an Australian children's writer and journalist.

Early life and education 
Nance Clare Pender was born in Maitland on 7 March 1915, youngest daughter of Archibald Thomas and Clara Rose Pender. She had two sisters and three brothers. She was educated at Maitland High School and was appointed secretary of the Old Girls' Union's Younger Set in 1934.

Career 
Donkin had her first short story published at the age of eight and began writing on social happenings for the Maitland Daily Mercury at 16. From there she moved to the Newcastle Morning Herald where she was social and fashion editor and also reviewed films.

Donkin married Victor E. Donkin at West Maitland on 14 January 1939 and moved to England where she worked as a freelance writer, including radio scripts. The following year her husband's company transferred him back to Australia and she began writing as Alison Clare.

Nancy Shepherdson, writing in Twentieth-century Children's Writers, considered Donkin's first books to have "uninspired plots and much digressive conversation". 

Donkin served as president of the Children's Book Council of Australia (Victoria) from 1968 to 1976.

In 1984 she wrote Stranger and Friend, a nonfiction book about Greek migrants to Australia. She had first visited Greece 18 years earlier and returned several times. The book aimed to improve the relationship between Greeks and Australians by describing the Greek tradition of hospitality and friendship.

Donkin wrote two collections of biographies of Australian women, The Women Were There: Nineteen Women Who Enlivened Australia's History and Always a Lady: Courageous Women of Colonial Australia.

Awards and recognition 
Donkin was appointed a Member of the Order of Australia in the 1986 Australia Day Honours for "service to the community, particularly in the fields of children's literature and adult education". She received the Alice Award from the NSW branch of the Society of Women Writers in 1990.

Selected works

Fiction 
Araluen Adventures, (Edith B. Bowden, illustrator), 1946
 House by the Water, 1969
A Currency Lass, (Jane Walker, illustrator), 1969
 Johnny Neptune, 1971
Margaret Catchpole (Edwina Bell, illustrator), 1974
 A Friend for Petros, 1974
 Yellowgum Girl, 1976
 Green Christmas, 1976
 The Best of the Bunch, (Edwina Bell, illustrator), 1978
 Nini, 1979
 Two at Sullivan Bay, (Margaret Senior, illustrator), 1985

Nonfiction 
Stranger and Friend: The Greek-Australian Experience, 1984
The Women Were There: Nineteen Women Who Enlivened Australia's History, 1988
Always a Lady: Courageous Women of Colonial Australia, 1990

Death 
Donkin died at Faversham House in Canterbury, Victoria on 18 April 2008. She was survived by her daughter and son and their families. Her death notice in the Herald Sun concluded, "A storyteller, a teller of tales and weaver of dreams".

Nancy Donkin Literary Award 
The Nancy Donkin Literary Award was inaugurated by Donkin's family and the Society of Women Writers Victoria and has been presented biennially since 2009. 

Winners:

 2009 Ruth Starke
 2011 Isobel Carmody 
 2013 Cassandra Golds
 2015 Roseanne Hawke
 2017 Anna Walker
 2019 Dianne Wolfer
 2021 Anna Ciddor

References 

1915 births
2008 deaths
20th-century Australian women writers
Australian children's writers
Members of the Order of Australia